Tyner is a small, unincorporated community in southeastern Jackson County, KY. The town is located at the junction of U.S. Route 421, KY Route 30 and KY Route 3630. Tyner Elementary School (K-5) is located in the community and is operated by the Jackson County Public School system. The community offers a few services such as a post office, grocery store, and gas station.

References

Unincorporated communities in Jackson County, Kentucky
Unincorporated communities in Kentucky